Spain participated in the Eurovision Song Contest 2002 with an entry selected through the first series of the reality casting show Operación Triunfo. Rosa with the song "Europe's Living a Celebration", composed by Toni and Xasqui Ten, was chosen through televoting by the Spanish public.

Rosa placed 7th with 81 points at Eurovision, where her backing singers where her fellow contestants from Operación Triunfo David Bisbal, David Bustamante, Chenoa, Gisela (who would represent Andorra in 2008) and Geno.

Before Eurovision

Operación Triunfo 

The first season of Operación Triunfo was broadcast from the Mediapark Studios in Sant Just Desvern, Barcelona and was hosted by Carlos Lozano. After the regular final of Operación Triunfo that took place on 11 February 2002 (where Rosa was declared the overall winner of the season), the top three contestants - Rosa herself, David Bisbal, and David Bustamante - qualified for the Eurovision phase of the contest, which consisted of two semi-final shows and a final.

First Round 
In the first round on 25 February 2002, three songs were assigned to each contestant among those submitted to national broadcaster TVE, making a total of nine songs. A six-person jury eliminated one of the songs assigned to each artist, leaving a total of six.

Second Round 
In the second round on 4 March 2002, a finalist song was then chosen for each contestant though televoting. The three songs that participated in the final were "La magia del corazón" by David Bustamante, "Corazón Latino" by David Bisbal, and "Europe's Living a Celebration" by Rosa.

Final
The final took place on 11 March 2002. At the close of voting, Rosa received the highest number of votes and was proclaimed the winner and entrant for Spain at the Eurovision Song Contest 2002.

At Eurovision
At Eurovision, Rosa performed 5th, following Greece and preceding Croatia. At the close of the voting she had received 81 points, placing 7th of 24.

Voting

References 

2002
Countries in the Eurovision Song Contest 2002
Eurovision
Eurovision